Vasily Karmanov (1927 – 1967) was a Soviet swimmer. He competed in the men's 4 × 200 metre freestyle relay at the 1952 Summer Olympics.

References

1927 births
1967 deaths
Soviet male freestyle swimmers
Olympic swimmers of the Soviet Union
Swimmers at the 1952 Summer Olympics
Place of birth missing